State Route 366 (SR 366) is a highway in Graham County, Arizona that runs from its junction with US 191 south of Safford to near the summit of Mount Graham.  It is a winding mountain road with one half primarily a northwest-southeast route, the other half being northeast-southwest.

Route description
SR 366 is a  highway that connects Mount Graham with US 191 (originally US 666) at Swift Trail Junction south of Safford.  The western terminus of the highway is located near a ranger station near the peak of Mount Graham.  The highway heads in a southeastern route as it descends the mountain.  There are several hair pin turns as the highway follows the terrain.  At Turkey Flat, the highway goes through a series of five hair pin turns.  The highway also begins to generally head in a northeasterly direction from this point on.  The terrain eventually smooths out and the highway follows a straight path towards the northeast to its eastern terminus at US 191.

SR 366 traverses sparsely inhabited forest and mountain terrain and does not pass through any cities or towns aside from minor settlements. It also provides access to the Mount Graham International Observatory. Part of SR 366 is designated as the Swift Trail Parkway under the Arizona Parkways, Historic and Scenic Roads program.

History
Later that same year, it was extended an additional  to the Columbine Ranger Station. At this time the road was a gravel road providing access to the Coronado National Forest. Since that time, the easternmost  have been paved while the rest remains as a gravel road.

Junction list

References

External links

Arizona Roads

366
Transportation in Graham County, Arizona